The Reina Sofía School of Music (Escuela Superior de Música Reina Sofía in Spanish) is a private music school founded in Madrid, Spain, in 1991 by Paloma O'Shea. It belongs to the Albéniz Foundation, and it bears the name of its Honorary President, Queen Sofía of Spain.

History 
The School was founded by Paloma O'Shea in 1991 in Madrid, in order to provide Spain with a high performance training centre for young musicians and to carry out activities to bring Classical music to the larger public.

The inception of the School can be found in the  Paloma O'Shea Santander International Piano Competition, which Paloma O’Shea created in 1972, and in the masterclasses organised by her from 1981 on in collaboration with Universidad Internacional de Verano Menéndez Pelayo, also in Santander.

In the first steps of the project, as well as in the selection of the teaching staff, the School counted on the advice of great masters such as Yehudi Menuhin, Mstislav Rostropovich, Daniel Barenboim, Zubin Mehta and Alicia de Larrocha, who also were or are part of the Academic Committee and of the Board of the School, as well as active consultants of the Chairs. The collaboration of Federico Sopeña and Enrique Franco, key figures of twentieth-century Spanish musical culture, was also essential.

Campus 
The School's location is in the Plaza de Oriente, next to the Royal Palace and the Teatro Real. This location, situated in Requena street, housed once the Performing Arts and Dance School.

Sony Auditorium 
The Reina Sofía School of Music has a concert hall on campus, the Sony Auditorium, that holds an average of 150 concerts annually. With a seating capacity of 351 people, the Auditorium is designed as a chamber music concert hall, with an acoustic design by Vicente Maestre, and features an organ built by Gerhard Grenzing.

Faculty 

The Reina Sofía Music School has teachers who have excelled in the exercise of the two aspects of their masters: art and education. Therefore, the faculty holding chairs is composed of leading figures of recognized international prestige.
In addition to this regular team, each year professors invited to the Masterclasses Program complement the work of the school with different conceptions and perspectives.

Present professors 
Among the professors that presently teach at the School are Zakhar Bron, Marco Rizzi, Diemut Poppen, Nobuko Imai, Ivan Monighetti, Jens Peter Maintz, Jacques Zoon, Hansjörg Schellenberger, Pascal Moraguès, Gustavo Núñez, Radovan Vlatkovic, Dmitri Bashkirov, Galina Eguiazarova, Francisco Araiza, Fabián Panisello, Heime Müller and Márta Gulyás.

Academic and artistic activity 

The Reina Sofía School of Music, as part of its higher education programmes, provides Bachelor's Degree in Music (from 2015-2016 in accordance with the Bologna Process), Master's in Music Performance, Foundation Course and Diploma in Music Performance. Throughout all these programmes students receive a tailored education, adapted to each student's needs and potencial. 

In addition, one of the most characteristic aspects of the academic training in the School is its intense artistic activity. This means that, each academic year, the School organizes more than 300 concerts in its Auditorium and in different venues throughout Spain.

Students 

The Reina Sofía School trains about 150 students each year, from all origins. Thanks to the financial support granted by both public and privates entities, all students enjoy free tuition and other economic grants.

During their stay at the School, each student takes part in orchestral and chamber groups, and performs in around 20 concerts a year.

Notable alumni 
Since its foundation in 1991, the Reina Sofía School has trained more than 850 students, some of which have had notable careers as performers: Aquiles Machado, Arcadi Volodos, Asier Polo, Celso Albelo, Cuarteto Casals, Eldar Nebolsin, Juan Pérez Floristán, Latica Honda-Rosenberg, Nora Salvi, Pablo Ferrández, Rui Borges Maia, Sol Gabetta, Tommaso Lonquich, Wen Xiao Zheng, Xavier Inchausti, Dúo del Valle, Cuarteto Quiroga, Ana Lucrecia García, Johane González Seijas, Stanislav Ioudenitch, Ismael Jordi, Claudio Martínez Mehner, Luis Fernando Pérez, David Kadouch, Emil Rovner, and Pablo Díaz.

Orchestras 
The Reina Sofía School of Music has a variety of orchestras that are formed by its students and conducted by School professors and guest conductors: the Camerata Viesgo, the Sinfonietta in collaboration with Fundación BBVA, the Freixenet Symphony Orchestra and the Freixenet Chamber Orchestra.

Among the renowned conductors that have conducted these orchestras are: András Schiff, Andrés Orozco-Estrada, Vladimir Ashkenazy, Luciano Berio, Péter Csaba, Sir Colin Davis, Peter Eötvös, Pablo González, Pablo Heras-Casado, Jesús López Cobos, Lorin Maazel, Yehudi Menuhin, Zubin Mehta, Krzysztof Penderecki, Josep Pons, Antoni Ros Marbà and Jordi Savall.

See also

 Paloma O'Shea Santander International Piano Competition

References

External links
Official website of the school
Albeniz Foundation
Video about the school

Music schools in Spain
Culture in Madrid
Albéniz Foundation
Education in Madrid
Buildings and structures in Palacio neighborhood, Madrid
Educational institutions established in 1991
1991 establishments in Spain